Manoj Kumar Mukherjee (1 December 1933 – 17 April 2021) was an Indian jurist. He served as the Chief Justices of the Bombay High Court and Allahabad High Court and former judge of the Supreme Court of India. He was the head of Mukherjee Commission.

Career
Mukherjee was born in 1933 in British India. He did his schooling in East Indian Railway School in Asansol. He passed B.Sc. and LL.B thereafter started his lawyer career in Asansol Court, in the state of West Bengal in 1956. He worked in the Calcutta High Court as a criminal law expert since December 1962 and in 1977 he was appointed a Judge of this Court. He was transferred to the Allahabad High Court on 12 November 1991 as the Chief Justice. In January 1993 Mukherjee became the Chief Justice Bombay High Court. He was also appointed a Judge of the Supreme Court in 1993.

In 1999, after retirement, Mukherjee was appointed the chairperson of Mukherjee Commission to inquire into the death of Subhas Chandra Bose. His name was recommended by the then Chief Justice of India.

References

1933 births
2021 deaths
Indian judges
Justices of the Supreme Court of India
Chief Justices of the Allahabad High Court
Judges of the Calcutta High Court
Chief Justices of the Bombay High Court
Bengali Hindus
20th-century Indian judges
20th-century Indian lawyers
21st-century Indian judges